Liga Deportiva Universitaria de Quito's 2004 season was the club's 74th year of existence, the 51st year in professional football, and the 43rd in the top level of professional football in Ecuador.

Kits
Supplier: Umbro
Sponsor(s): Siemens Mobile, Coca-Cola, Pilsener

Squad

Competitions

Serie A

First stage

Results

Second Stage

Results

Liguilla Final

Results

Copa Libertadores

Copa Libertadores squad

First stage

Round of 16

Copa Sudamericana

Copa Sudamericana squad

First stage

Second stage

Quarterfinals

Semifinals

References
RSSSF - 2004 Serie A 
RSSSF - 2004 Copa Libertadores 
RSSSF - 2004 Copa Sudamericana

External links
Official Site 
LDU Quito (2) - Aucas (3)
LDU Quito (2) - Emelec (0)
LDU Quito (3) - Barcelona SC (1) 3rd goal
Aucas (5) - LDU Quito (1)
LDU Quito (3) - El Nacional (2) 2nd goal
LDU Quito (5) - Emelec (2) 2nd goal
LDU Quito (2) - ESPOLI (1) 1st goal
Barcelona SC (2) - LDU Quito (1)
LDU Quito (1) - Aucas (0)
Aucas (0) - LDU Quito (2) 2nd goal

2004
Ldu